Stapleton is a small unincorporated community in northern Baldwin County, Alabama, United States, with a population of 519.. It is part of the Daphne-Fairhope-Foley metropolitan area. Stapleton lies along U.S. Route 31 and State Route 59 and has been considered for incorporation within the cities of Loxley and Bay Minette. There is a bluegrass music festival held at Stapleton Elementary School every fall. There are about 250 students at the school that runs from Pre-K to the 6th grade.

Demographics

History 
The first post office in the town of Canby, as Stapleton was then known, was established in 1895. Later, the Hamm brothers of Chicago, IL convinced the Louisville and Nashville Railroad (L&N) to build a subsidiary line between Bay Minette and Foley. By 1905 this spur called the Bay Minette & Fort Morgan Railroad had penetrated the thirty-seven miles of dense Baldwin County pine forests with the town of Canby lying along the route. Shortly afterwards the town's name was changed to honor W. D. Stapleton, the man who was instrumental in getting a railroad depot for their town. The railroad  was important to the local economy and early on the trains passed through Stapleton several times a day as they made their way to the southern end of the county and back.  Highway traffic also picked up as of 1936 when the only paved road in Baldwin County, other than a small strip in Bay Minette going from the courthouse to the railroad, was the stretch of US 31 coming in from Atmore and ending at Stapleton.  By the 1970s the train traffic had slowed to at most one train making the down and back trip each day. Now the train tracks are completely gone.

Education
Stapleton is zoned to schools in the Baldwin County Public Schools. Stapleton Elementary School serves Pre-K through 6th grade. Grades 7 through 8 attend Bay Minette Middle School. Grades 9 through 12 are zoned to Baldwin County High School. The students can participate in band starting in sixth grade, but are also exposed to many other opportunities at their after school program.

References 

Unincorporated communities in Baldwin County, Alabama
Unincorporated communities in Alabama